Bruce Rogers (born 4 June 1957) is a Canadian former swimmer. He competed in the men's 200 metre butterfly at the 1976 Summer Olympics.

References

External links
 

1957 births
Living people
Canadian male butterfly swimmers
Olympic swimmers of Canada
Swimmers at the 1976 Summer Olympics
Universiade medalists in swimming
Swimmers from Toronto
Universiade bronze medalists for Canada
Medalists at the 1977 Summer Universiade